Wat Buppharam is a Buddhist temple in Chiang Mai, Thailand. Founded in 1497 by King Mueang Kaeo, the temple was where Kawila began a ritual circumambulation of Chiang Mai to reoccupy it after two centuries of Burmese rule. Most of the temple buildings date to the late 1800s. The temple is also known for its Burmese-style chedi, which was rebuilt in 1958, and a Lanna-style ordination hall made from teak and glass inlay mosaic, built in 1819.

References 

Buppharam
15th-century Buddhist temples